Accent Records was a Hollywood-based record label formed in 1954. Scott Seely was the president. Nick Lucas signed to the label in 1955 and made his final recording for them in 1980. Previously releasing only singles, Accent's first LP record, an album by Drew Page, was released in 1956.

History
1966 saw GNP Crescendo make a marketing, packaging, and distribution deal with Accent for Buddy Merrill's guitar albums, following a tip that Merrill's recordings were selling well as a result of in-store plays.

In 1967 Accent made the decision to focus on country music.

The label promoted a self-learn course for pop singers in 1971.

Seely remained president until at least 2006. Accent Records owned the Boomerang Music and S&R Music publishing companies.

Artists

 Bob Bellows
 Roy Goodrich
 Nick Lucas
 Buddy Merrill
 Bill Myrick
 Kelly Norwood
 Millicent Rodgers
 Wes Stuart
 Clarice Howard
 Dick Dale
 Katherine Kovar
 Becky Cooper

External links
 45rpm numerical discography
 Accent at Discogs

References

Record labels established in 1954
1954 establishments in California
Jazz record labels
American companies established in 1954